John Dennis Yelverton Bingham (11 August 1880 – 28 December 1940) was a British Olympic polo player.

Biography
He was born on 11 August 1880 in Bangor, County Down in Northern Ireland to John George Barry Bingham and Matilda Catherine Ward. He competed in the 1924 Paris Summer Olympic Games and won the bronze medal alongside teammates Frederick Guest, Frederick W. Barrett, and Kinnear Wise. He died on 28 December 1940 in Cirencester.

References 

Polo players at the 1924 Summer Olympics
Olympic bronze medallists for Great Britain
Olympic polo players of Great Britain
English polo players
1940 deaths
1880 births
Medalists at the 1924 Summer Olympics
Olympic medalists in polo